Antoni Brzozowski (11 December 1900 – 19 August 1957) was a Polish rowing coxswain. He competed in the men's coxed four event at the 1924 Summer Olympics.

References

External links
 

1900 births
1957 deaths
Polish male rowers
Olympic rowers of Poland
Rowers at the 1924 Summer Olympics
Rowers from Warsaw
People from Warsaw Governorate
Coxswains (rowing)